Rita Deli (born 21 August 1972 in Tatabánya) is a former Hungarian team handball player who received the silver medal at the 2000 Summer Olympics in Sydney and collected the bronze at the 1998 European Championship in the Netherlands.

She was forced to retire because of a recurrent Achilles tendon injury in 2004.  Deli currently works as the head coach for her former club Alcoa FKC.

Achievements
Nemzeti Bajnokság I:
Winner: 2000
Women Handball Austria:
Winner: 2001, 2002
ÖHB Cup:
Winner: 2001, 2002
EHF Cup Winners' Cup:
Winner: 1995

Awards and recognition
 Nemzeti Bajnokság I Top Scorer: 1999, 2000 
 Knight's Cross of the Order of Merit of the Republic of Hungary: 2000

References

External links

1972 births
Living people
People from Tatabánya
Hungarian female handball players
Hungarian handball coaches
Olympic silver medalists for Hungary
Handball players at the 2000 Summer Olympics
Olympic medalists in handball
Expatriate handball players
Hungarian expatriate sportspeople in Austria
Knight's Crosses of the Order of Merit of the Republic of Hungary (civil)
Fehérvár KC players
Medalists at the 2000 Summer Olympics
Sportspeople from Komárom-Esztergom County